Cibea is one of 54 parishes in Cangas del Narcea, a municipality within the province and autonomous community of Asturias, in northern Spain.

Villages
 L'Abechera
 Ḷḷamera
 La Riela de Cibea
 La Reguera'l Cabu
 Sigueiru
 Sonande
 Surrodiles
 Vaḷḷáu
 Viḷḷar de los Indianos
 Viḷḷeirín

References  

Parishes in Cangas del Narcea